Sofia Lundgren (born September 20, 1982) is a Swedish football goalkeeper for Damallsvenskan club FC Rosengård and the Swedish national team.

She has formerly played for leading Swedish teams such as Umeå IK and AIK before signing a two-year contract with Linköpings FC in the autumn of 2008.

Since making her national team debut in a 6–3 win over England in March 2002, Lundgren competed with Caroline Jönsson, Hedvig Lindahl and latterly Kristin Hammarström for the goalkeeper position.

When Lundgren was injured before the tournament, Maja Åström was drafted into Sweden's squad for UEFA Women's Euro 2005 as the third choice goalkeeper.

A back injury kept a frustrated Lundgren out of Sweden's 2013 Algarve Cup squad. The injury eventually kept Lundgren out of all football for one-and-a-half seasons. She signed for Damallsvenskan newcomers Hammarby IF DFF in January 2015. At the beginning of the 2016 season Lundgren signed a short-term contract with Swedish champions FC Rosengård. The contract was extended when Rosengård's first choice goalkeeper Erin McLeod suffered an anterior cruciate ligament injury and Zecira Musovic struggled to overcome a broken arm.

References

External links

 
 
 
 Linköpings FC profile 
  
 Profile  at SvFF
 
 

1982 births
Living people
Swedish women's footballers
Footballers at the 2012 Summer Olympics
Olympic footballers of Sweden
Sweden women's international footballers
2003 FIFA Women's World Cup players
Linköpings FC players
Damallsvenskan players
Umeå IK players
AIK Fotboll (women) players
Hammarby Fotboll (women) players
Sportspeople from Umeå
Women's association football goalkeepers
FC Rosengård players
2011 FIFA Women's World Cup players
2007 FIFA Women's World Cup players